Charles Herbert Levin (March 12, 1949 –  June 28, 2019) was an American actor who appeared in television, movies and on stage. He was best known for the role of Elliot Novak on the series Alice, having become a regular in the show's ninth season, and the recurring role of Eddie Gregg on Hill Street Blues from 1982 to 1986.

Life and career
Charles Levin was born on March 12, 1949, and from Chicago, Illinois, U.S. He was an American actor and appeared in television, movies and on stage. He was married to Katherine DeHetre from 1983 to 2007. This couple had 3 children Jesse Levin, Ben Levin, and Kate Levin. In 2007, Katherine passed away in a car accident. Levin was also known for playing the mohel in "The Bris" episode of Seinfeld, and Coco, the gay cook, in the pilot episode of The Golden Girls. His part was dropped because the part of Sophia Petrillo (played by Estelle Getty) changed from a recurring part to a main character.

Levin appeared as a guest star on many television shows including Alice which he was best known for the role of Elliot Novak, he become a regular in the show’s 9th season and the recurring role of Eddie Gregg on Hill Street Blues from 1982 to 1986. Capital News (as Vinnie DiSalvo), Family Ties, Tales from the Darkside, The Twilight Zone, The Facts of Life, Falcon Crest (as Arthur Haberman), Punky Brewster (as Officer Bob), Thirtysomething, Night Court, L.A. Law (as Robert Caporale), Designing Women, Murphy Brown, NYPD Blue, and Law & Order. He was Jewish.

Disappearance and death
On July 8, 2019, Charles Levin's son reported to the police that Levin was missing, and had not been heard from since June 28. At the time, Levin lived in Grants Pass, Oregon, and was in the process of moving to a new house in the town. Levin's car was found on July 12 on a remote road northeast of Selma, Oregon. The body of his dog, Boo Bear, was found inside. Levin's body was found a day later. On November 8, 2019, authorities confirmed Levin's cause of death to be accidental. His car became stuck where it was later found, on an unmaintained wilderness road. After trying to free it, it appeared he left the car in search of help and fell to his death down a  embankment. He was 70 years old.

Filmography

 Everybody Rides the Carousel (1975) – Stage 6 (voice)
 Annie Hall (1977) – Actor in Rehearsal
 Between the Lines (1977) – Paul
 A Doonesbury Special (1977) – Mark Slackmeyer
 Rush It (1978) – Dr. Levy
 Manhattan (1979) – Television Actor #1
 The Seduction of Joe Tynan (1979) – John Cairn
 Honeysuckle Rose (1980) – Sid
Washington Mistress (1982, TV Movie) – Larry
 Deal of the Century (1983) – Dr. Rechtin
 Alice (1976) (Season 8 recurring, Season 9 regular: 1983–85) – Elliot Novak 
 This Is Spinal Tap (1984) – Disc 'n' Dat Manager
 Do You Remember Love (1985, TV Movie) – Dr. Raymond Sawyer
 The Golden Girls (1985, TV pilot) - Coco
 The Man with One Red Shoe (1985) – CIA Dentist
 The Golden Child (1986) – TV Host
 The Couch Trip (1988) – TV Reporter
Home Free (1988, TV Movie) – Barry Kramer
 No Holds Barred (1989) – Ordway
 Immediate Family (1989) – Eli's Dad
 Opposites Attract (1990) – Marcino
 Seinfeld (1989) (Episode: The Bris, 1993) – The Mohel 
 A Civil Action (1998) – Geologist (final film role)

References

External links
 
 

1949 births
2019 deaths
20th-century American male actors
Accidental deaths from falls
Accidental deaths in Oregon
American male film actors
American male television actors
American male stage actors
Male actors from Chicago
People from Grants Pass, Oregon
Yale School of Drama alumni